Khalatala may refer to:
Xalatala, Azerbaijan
Xalatalabinə, Azerbaijan 
Xələftala, Azerbaijan